C95 or variation, may refer to:

 ECO code for Ruy Lopez, Breyer Variation chess openings
 ICD-10 code for Leukaemia of unspecified cell type
 a branding name for Canadian radio CFMC-FM
 Protection of Wages Convention, 1949, a conference by International Labour Organization
 ANSI C95, officially ANSI C Amendment 1 or ISO/IEC 9899/AMD1:1995, a past version of the C programming language standard
 Honda C95 Benly motorcycle
 C-95 Grasshopper, a 1941 American military cargo aircraft
 Embraer C-95 Bandeirante, a Brazilian military transport aircraft
 95th Comiket

See also

 
 
 95 (disambiguation)
 C (disambiguation)